Mario Mendez (born June 21, 1989) is a former member of the Rhode Island House of Representatives from the 13th district. Elected in November 2018, he assumed office on January 1, 2019.

Background 
Mendez was raised in Johnston, Rhode Island. He earned a Bachelor of Arts degree from Rhode Island College. Mendez was elected to the Rhode Island House of Representatives in November 2018 and assumed office on January 1, 2019. In his 2020 re-election campaign, Mendez lost the Democratic primary to Ramon Perez, who had previously represented the district from 2017 to 2018.

References 

Living people
1989 births
Hispanic and Latino American state legislators in Rhode Island
Democratic Party members of the Rhode Island House of Representatives
Rhode Island College alumni
21st-century American politicians
People from Johnston, Rhode Island